The episode list of the ABC sitcom Boy Meets World. The series ran from September 24, 1993, to May 5, 2000, with 158 episodes produced, spanning 7 seasons.

Series overview

Episodes

Season 1 (1993–94)

Season 2 (1994–95)

Season 3 (1995–96)

Season 4 (1996–97)

Season 5 (1997–98)

Season 6 (1998–99)

Season 7 (1999–2000)

Ratings

Notes

References

External links

Lists of American sitcom episodes
Episodes
Lists of Disney television series episodes